Capel Island (Gaeilge: Oileán an Cháplaigh) is a small island in County Cork, Ireland located a short distance from Knockadoon Head, near Youghal.

Features
Capel Island and Knockadoon Head were legally protected as a national nature reserve by the Irish government in 1985. Most of the reserve, is owned by the state, with a small part in private ownership . The reserve includes Capel Island, Knockadoon Head and the area of sea between.

The tower on the island is an incomplete 19th century lighthouse. The island is home to a herd of goats.

A story is told of how the island got its name. There was a swimming race to reach the island for ownership. As one man was about to touch land the other reached forth his sword and pipped him at the post. A name associated with this story is De Capel Brookes.

Permission from BirdWatch Ireland is required in order to land on the island.

References

Islands of County Cork
Uninhabited islands of Ireland
Geography of County Cork
Nature reserves in the Republic of Ireland
Protected areas established in 1985
1985 establishments in Ireland